Terebra pellyi is a species of sea snail, a marine gastropod mollusc in the family Terebridae, the auger snails. It is found in the Persian Gulf.

Taxonomy and systematics 
The species was described by Edgar Smith in 1877, on the basis of specimens collected in the Persian Gulf by Colonel Lewis Pelly. The specific epithet is in honor of Colonel Pelly.

Description 
It is distinguished by two to three spiral furrows around its periphery, out of which the uppermost one is most distinct.

References

Terebridae
Gastropods described in 1877